Ivan Andreyevich Kabanov (1823 – November 30, 1869) was a Russian painter.

Biography
Ivan Kabanov was born in the village of Staroverskaya, Orenburg Governorate, Russian Empire.

In 1845–1849 he studied at the Moscow School of Painting, Sculpture and Architecture.

Gallery

References

External links
 Кабанов Иван Андреевич

1823 births
1869 deaths
19th-century painters from the Russian Empire
Moscow School of Painting, Sculpture and Architecture alumni